2018 U.S. Open may refer to:

2018 U.S. Open (golf), a major golf tournament
2018 US Open (tennis), a grand slam tennis event
2018 U.S. Open (badminton)
2018 U.S. Open Cup, a soccer tournament